Warren Hills is an American Viticultural Area (AVA) in Warren County, New Jersey.

Warren Hills may also refer to:
Warren Hills Regional Middle School;
Warren Hills Regional High School; or
Warren Hills Regional School District,
all located within the Warren Hills wine region.

See also
Warren Hill (disambiguation)